Hastings River (Birpai: Doongang), an open and trained intermediate wave dominated barrier estuary, is located in the Northern Tablelands and Mid North Coast districts of New South Wales, Australia.

Course and features
Hastings River rises in the Great Dividing Range, southwest of Kemps Pinnacle, in the area surrounding Oxley Wild Rivers National Park and Werrikimbe National Park and flows generally south, southeast and east, joined by seven tributaries including the Tobins, Forbes, Ellenborough, Pappinbarra and Thone rivers, before reaching its mouth, flowing into the Tasman Sea of the South Pacific Ocean, at Port Macquarie. The river descends  over its  course.

The course of the river flows adjacent to the settlements Ellenborough, Long Flat, Beechwood, Wauchope and Port Macquarie. The Oxley Highway is generally aligned with the middle and lower reaches of the river. West of Port Macquarie, the Pacific Highway crosses the Hastings River.

History
The Hastings River has been inhabited by Birpai Aboriginal people for thousands of years, who knew it as Doongang.

The river was first charted by European explorers in 1818, after being sighted by John Oxley. He named the river the Hastings River for the then Governor-General of India, Francis Rawdon-Hastings, 1st Marquess of Hastings.

On 19 November 2002, two anglers found the dismembered body of murdered Sydney drug dealer, Terry Falconer. Investigations revealed that Falconer had died three days beforehand, after his corpse had been cut up and dumped in the Hastings River by Anthony Perish and his criminal gang associates.

The River flooded in March 2021 during a severe weather event affecting much of New South Wales.

Recreation, flora and fauna
The Hastings River gives its name to the Hastings River wine region and to an endangered species of mammal, the Hastings River Mouse (Pseudomys oralis).

Fishing opportunities on the Hastings River exist for freshwater bass and catfish in the upper reaches to estuarine species such as bream, flathead and luderick near the river mouth.

See also

 Rivers of New South Wales
 List of rivers in New South Wales (A-K)
 List of rivers of Australia

Gallery

References

External links
 

 

Rivers of New South Wales
Mid North Coast
Northern Tablelands